Shahid Haghani Metro Station is a station in Tehran Metro Line 1.  It is located next to Shahid Haghani Expressway Between the junctions with Hemmat Expressway and Modares Expressway. It is between Shahid Hemmat Metro Station and Mirdamad Metro Station. This station also has a great parking.

Facilities 
The station has a ticket office, escalators, elevators, cash machines, toilets, a taxi stand, bus routes, pay phones, water fountains, parking, and a lost and found.

Tehran Metro stations